Skygirls is a collaborative album between Brazilian musicians Rogério Skylab and Leandra "Voz del Fuego" Lambert, famous for her work with bands such as Inhumanoids! and Lingerie Underground. Also counting with a guest appearance by Onno bassist Eliza Schinner, the album was released in 2009 through independent label Psicotropicodelia.

An electronica-inflected release strongly inspired by the works of Franco-British band Stereolab, Skylab states that it is one of his favorite albums, and that he was very proud of making it.

The album can be downloaded for free on Skylab's official website.

Track listing

Personnel
 Rogério Skylab – vocals
 Leandra "Voz del Fuego" Lambert – vocals, programming (track 16), keyboard
 Thiago Martins – electric guitar
 Bruno Coelho – drums
 Eliza Schinner – bass guitar
 Solange Venturi – production, photography
 Flávio Lazarino – cover art

References

2009 albums
Collaborative albums
Rogério Skylab albums
Obscenity controversies in music
Albums free for download by copyright owner